(born March 22, 2000) is a Japanese professional wrestler currently signed to the World Wonder Ring Stardom promotion. Since making her debut on November 16, 2014, she became a two-time Artist of Stardom Champion, one-time Goddess of Stardom Champion and one-time Wonder of Stardom Champion.

Professional wrestling career

World Wonder Ring Stardom

Early career (2014–2016)
On November 16, 2014, Watanabe made her professional wrestling debut at World Wonder Ring Stardom where she unsuccessfully challenged Takumi Iroha. On December 6, 2016, Watanabe received her first title match where she teamed with Io Shirai and Mayu Iwatani to challenge for the vacant Artist of Stardom Championship, which was won by Hyper Destroyers (Evie, Hiroyo Matsumoto and Kellie Skater) in a three-way tag team match, which also involved Oedo Tai (Act Yasukawa, Kris Wolf and Kyoko Kimura).

Queen's Quest (2016–2021)

Entering 2016, Jungle Kyona and Watanabe teamed together under the name "JKGReeeeN". On January 10, JKGReeeeN challenged Thunder Rock (Iwatani and Shirai) for the Goddesses of Stardom Championship, but were unsuccessful. JKGReeeeN continued to wrestle through 2016 and even participated in the Goddesses of Stardom Tag League, although she did not make it to the finals. shortly after the Tag League, Watanabe turned on Kyona to join Shirai's unit "Queen's Quest".

On January 7, 2017, Watanabe, along with HZK and Shirai, defeated Kagetsu, Kyoko Kimura and Viper, who replaced Hana Kimura due to injury, to win the Artist of Stardom Championship. The trio held the championship until April 9, where the title was vacated as Watanabe was sidelined with an injury. After 10 months of injury, Watanabe returned on November 4, where she defeated Wolf.

On February 18, 2018, Watanabe challenged the leader of Queen's Quest Shirai for the Wonder of Stardom Championship in the main event at the Korakuen Hall, but was unsuccessful. On April 30, Watanabe won the 2018 Cinderella Tournament after defeating Bea Priestley in the finals. She expressed her wish which was a match for the Wonder of Stardom Championship against the then-time champion Io Shirai. On May 23, Watanabe defeated Shirai to win the Wonder title, becoming the youngest wrestler to hold the title at the age of 18. On November 4, Watanabe, along with fellow Queen's Quest member Utami Hayashishita won the Goddess of Stardom Tag League after defeating Chardonnay and Priestley in the finals. On November 23, Hayashishita and Watanabe defeated J.A.N. (Jungle Kyona and Natsuko Tora) to win the Goddesses of Stardom Championship.

On April 5, 2019, Watanabe participated in Stardom's first event at the United States in New York City, where she successfully defended the Wonder of Stardom Championship against her tag team partner Hayashishita. At Stardom Cinderella Tournament 2019 on April 29, Watanabe fell short to Konami in the first rounds. On May 16, Watanabe lost the Wonder of Stardom Championship to Arisa Hoshiki, ending her reign at 358 days, and setting a record with most successful title defenses, at 13. On July 15, Hayashishita and Watanabe lost the Goddesses of Stardom Championship to Tokyo Cyber Squad (Jungle Kyona and Konami). On November 23, Watanabe, along with AZM and Hayashishita, won the Artist of Stardom Championship after they defeated Andras Miyagi, Kagetsu and Natsu Sumire.

On January 19, 2020, during the main event of Stardom 9th Anniversary, Watanabe challenged Iwatani for the World of Stardom Championship, but was unsuccessful. On February 8, AZM, Hayashishita and Watanabe lost the Artist of Stardom Championship to Donna Del Mondo (Giulia, Maika and Syuri). At Stardom Yokohama Cinderella 2020 on October 3, she unsuccessfully challenged Bea Priestley for the SWA World Championship. On November 8, Watanabe, along with AZM, won the Goddesses of Stardom Tag League when they defeated Giulia and Maika in the finals. After winning the Tag League, AZM and Watanabe challenged Hayashishita and Saya Kamitani on November 14 for the Goddesses of Stardom Championship, but were unsuccessful. On December 20, Watanabe challenged Hayashishita for the World of Stardom Championship, but was unsuccessful. At Stardom Osaka Dream Cinderella 2020 on December 20, Watanabe unsuccessfully challenged Utami Hayashishita for the World of Stardom Championship.

At Stardom 10th Anniversary Show on January 17, 2021, Watanabe teamed up with Saya Kamitani to defeat Donna Del Mondo (Himeka and Syuri), Oedo Tai (Bea Priestley and Saki Kashima) and Stars (Mayu Iwatani and Ruaka) in a Four-way elimination tag team match. On January 30, 2021, she challenged Syuri for the SWA World Championship, but was unsuccessful. At Stardom All Star Dream Cinderella on March 3, 2021, she unsuccessfully faced Nanae Takahashi. At Stardom Yokohama Dream Cinderella 2021 on April 4, Watanabe defeated Mina Shirakawa. At Stardom Cinderella Tournament 2021, she Watanabe fell short to Starlight Kid in the first rounds from April 10. At Yokohama Dream Cinderella 2021 in Summer from July 4, she teamed up with AZM to defeat Starlight Kid and Ruaka. At the Stardom 5 Star Grand Prix 2021, Watanabe fought in the "Red Goddess" block which she won with a total of 12 points after competing against Mayu Iwatani, Koguma, Starlight Kid, Himeka, Natsupoi, Fukigen Death, Giulia, Mina Shirakawa and Saki Kashima. She then fell short to Syuri in the finals on September 25. At Stardom 10th Anniversary Grand Final Osaka Dream Cinderella on October 9, 2021, Watanabe teamed up with Saya Kamitani and AZM to unsuccessfully challenge MaiHimePoi (Maika, Himeka and Natsupoi) for th Artist of Stardom Championship. Watanabe had been the victim of Starlight Kid's mind games as the latter's strategy to gain more recruits into Oedo Tai since Kawasaki Super Wars, the first event of the Stardom Super Wars trilogy which took place on November 3, 2021, Watanabe unsuccessfully challenged Starlight Kid for the High Speed Championship. At Tokyo Super Wars on November 27, Watanabe teamed up with AZM to defeat Unagi Sayaka and Lady C.

Oedo Tai (2021–present) 
Watanabe and Kid's feud degenerated into an eight-woman elimination tag team match in which both of them would be the captains of their respective teams. The loser captain would be forced to join the enemy unit and if Kid lost she would also have to unmask. The match took place on December 18, at Osaka Super Wars, the event which represented the last part of the "Super Wars" trilogy. With the match coming down to the wire and Queen's Quest holding a 2 to 1 advantage over Starlight Kid a shocking moment occurred when Watanabe betrayed her faction and hit her long-time tag team partner AZM over the head with a chair, handing the win to Oedo Tai and anointing herself the “Black Peach” of the group, turning heel in the process.

At Stardom Dream Queendom on December 29, Watanabe teamed up with Hazuki against Takumi Iroha and Mayu Iwatani but she dumped Hazuki during the match therefore attracting a loss. At Stardom Nagoya Supreme Fight on January 29, 2022, Watanabe and Starlight Kid battled Queens Quest's Utami Hayashishita and AZM in a winning effort as a result of a grudge tag team match.

At Stardom Nagoya Supreme Fight on January 29, 2022, Watanabe teamed up with Starlight Kid and defeated Utami Hayashishita and AZM in a grudge match. At Stardom Cinderella Journey on February 23, 2022, she teamed up with Ruaka to defeat Hayashishita and Lady C. On the first night of the Stardom World Climax 2022 from March 26, Watanabe teamed up with Kid as "Black Desire" to defeat FWC (Hazuki and Koguma) for the Goddess of Stardom Championship. On the second night from March 27, she defeated Hazuki in a singles match. At the Stardom Cinderella Tournament 2022, Watanabe fell short to AZM in the first rounds from April 3. At Stardom Golden Week Fight Tour on May 5, 2022, she alongside Starlight Kid dropped back the Goddess of Stardom Championship to Hazuki and Koguma. At Stardom Flashing Champions on May 28, 2022, she teamed up with Saki Kashima and Starlight Kid to defeat MaiHimePoi (Maika, Himeka and Natsupoi) for the Artist of Stardom Championship. At Stardom Fight in the Top on June 26, 2022, she alongside Kashima and Kid successfilly defended the artist titles against God's Eye (Syuri, Ami Sourei and Mirai) and Donna Del Mondo (Giulia, Maika and Mai Sakurai). At Mid Summer Champions in Tokyo, the first event of the Stardom Mid Summer Champions which took place on July 9, 2022, Watanabe unsuccessfully challenged Syuri for the World of Stardom Championship. At Mid Summer Champions in Osaka on July 24, she alongside Kid and Kashima defended the artist titles again against Giulia, Maika and Himeka. At Stardom in Showcase vol.1 on July 23, 2022, Watanabe participated in a Four-way falls count anywhere match won by AZM and also involving Tan Nakano and Koguma. At the Stardom 5 Star Grand Prix 2022, Watanabe fought in the "Blue Stars" block, scoring a total of 12 points after competing against Giulia, Mirai, Mayu Iwatani, Suzu Suzuki, Hazuki, Saya Kamitani, Starlight Kid, Natsupoi, Ami Sourei, Mina Shirakawa, Saya Iida and Hanan. At Stardom x Stardom: Nagoya Midsummer Encounter on August 21, 2022, Watanabe, Kid and Kashima successfully defended the artist titles against Cosmic Angels (Mina Shirakawa, Unagi Sayaka and Saki). At Stardom in Showcase vol.2 on September 25, 2022, Watanabe teamed up with Ruaka in a losing effort against Giulia and Rina Yamashita as a result of a Hardcore Rules Tag Team Match.

New Japan Pro-Wrestling (2021)

Watanabe wrestled in exhibition matches scheduled by New Japan Pro-Wrestling in order to promote joshi talent. On the first night of the Wrestle Grand Slam in MetLife Dome from September 4, Watanabe teamed up with Saya Kamitani to defeat with Lady C and Maika. On the second night from September 5, the two fell short to Giulia and Syuri

Championships and accomplishments 
 Pro Wrestling Illustrated
 Ranked No. 28 of the top 100 female singles wrestlers in the PWI Women's 100 in 2020
 Ranked No. 20 of the top 50 tag teams in the PWI Tag Team 50 in 2020 
 World Wonder Ring Stardom
 Wonder of Stardom Championship (1 time)
 Goddess of Stardom Championship (2 times) – with Utami Hayashishita (1) and Starlight Kid (1)
 Artist of Stardom Championship (3 times) – with HZK and Io Shirai (1), AZM and Utami Hayashishita (1), Saki Kashima and Starlight Kid (1)
 Cinderella Tournament (2018)
 Goddesses of Stardom Tag League (2018, 2020) – with Utami Hayashishita (2018) and AZM (2020)
 Stardom Year-End Award (4 times)
 Best Tag Team Award (2018) 
 Best Unit Award (2021) 
 Fighting Spirit Award (2016)
 MVP Award (2018)

References 

2000 births
Living people
Japanese female professional wrestlers
People from Sagamihara
Sportspeople from Kanagawa Prefecture
Wonder of Stardom Champions
21st-century professional wrestlers
Goddess of Stardom Champions
Artist of Stardom Champions